Zone B of the 1994 Davis Cup Europe/Africa Group III was one of two zones in the Europe/Africa Group III of the 1994 Davis Cup. 8 teams competed across two pools in a round robin competition; the top two teams in each pool progressed to the promotion play-offs, where they played for advancement to Group II in 1995.

Participating nations

Draw
 Venue: SSI Slovan Tennis Club, Bratislava, Slovakia
 Date: 18–22 May

Group A

Group B

1st to 4th place play-offs

5th to 8th place play-offs

Final standings

  and  promoted to Group II in 1995.

Round robin

Group A

Malta vs. Slovakia

Sudan vs. Turkey

Malta vs. Turkey

Sudan vs. Slovakia

Malta vs. Sudan

Slovakia vs. Turkey

Group B

Congo vs. Cyprus

Lithuania vs. Tunisia

Congo vs. Tunisia

Cyprus vs. Lithuania

Congo vs. Lithuania

Cyprus vs. Tunisia

1st to 4th place play-offs

Semifinals

Slovakia vs. Tunisia

Lithuania vs. Malta

Final

Lithuania vs. Slovakia

3rd to 4th play-off

Malta vs. Tunisia

5th to 8th place play-offs

5th to 8th play-offs

Congo vs. Turkey

Cyprus vs. Sudan

5th to 6th play-off

Cyprus vs. Turkey

7th to 8th play-off

Congo vs. Sudan

References

External links
Davis Cup official website

Davis Cup Europe/Africa Zone
Europe Africa Zone Group III